Maulvi Abdul Rahman Halim  is an Afghan Taliban politician who is currently serving as Deputy Minister of Rural Rehabilitation and Development since 23 November 2021.

References

Living people
Year of birth missing (living people)
Taliban government ministers of Afghanistan